Kyrgyzstan is divided into seven regions (Kyrgyz: облус, oblus; Russian: область, oblast'''). The capital, Bishkek, is administratively an independent city of republican significance, as well as being the capital of Chüy Region. Osh also has independent city status since 2003.

The regions, with their areas, census populations and capitals, are as follows:

Each region is further divided into districts (rayon''), administered by government-appointed officials. Rural communities consisting of up to twenty small settlements have their own elected mayors and councils.

See also
ISO 3166-2:KG

Notes

References

 
Subdivisions of Kyrgyzstan
Kyrgyzstan, Regions
Kyrgyzstan 1
Regions, Kyrgyzstan
Kyrgyzstan geography-related lists